Coombe is a settlement in the English county of Devon, situated some  north-east of the town of Tiverton.

External links

Villages in Devon